Jonathan Sebastián Galván (born 25 June 1992) is an Argentine professional footballer who plays as a centre-back for Racing Club, on loan from Argentinos Juniors.

Career
Galván began in the youth ranks of Primera B Nacional side Aldosivi, he was promoted into the club's first-team in 2011. He was first selected in the matchday squad on 9 April 2011 for the 2010–11 Argentine Primera División fixture against Tiro Federal, but he was an unused substitute. His first appearance for the club came on 3 September in 2011–12 versus Guillermo Brown, a match the club won 5–0. Over the course of 2011–12, 2012–13 and 2013–14, Galván managed to score his first career goal (vs. Gimnasia de Jujuy) but also received four red cards during that time. Over those years he made eighty-two league appearances for Aldosivi.

2014 saw Galván and Aldosivi gain promotion into the Argentine Primera División after they qualified from the 2014 Primera B Nacional. In his debut season in Argentina's top-flight he managed twenty-seven appearances, scored one goal but also received another red card. In total, Galván played one hundred and seventy-seven times and scored six goals for Aldosivi in six years. In July 2017, following Aldosivi's relegation, Galván completed a transfer to top-flight club Colón. Four matches followed in 2017–18, before none occurred in the first five months of 2018–19 which led to the midfielder leaving to Argentinos Juniors on 21 January 2019.

On 21 July 2021, Galván joined Huracán on a 18 month loan deal with a purchase option. However, the spell was cut short and Galván was instead loaned out to Racing Club on 14 July 2022, until the end of 2023 with an option to purchase $800,000 for half for half of his rights.

Career statistics
.

References

External links

1992 births
Living people
Sportspeople from Mar del Plata
Argentine footballers
Association football midfielders
Argentine Primera División players
Primera Nacional players
Aldosivi footballers
Club Atlético Colón footballers
Argentinos Juniors footballers
Central Córdoba de Rosario footballers
Unión de Santa Fe footballers
Club Atlético Huracán footballers
Racing Club de Avellaneda footballers